The Norwegian Academy Prize in memory of Thorleif Dahl (Det Norske Akademis Pris til minne om Thorleif Dahl) is awarded annually by the Norwegian Academy for Language and Literature (Det Norske Akademi for Sprog og Litteratur). The prize is given in recognition of the eminent literature, poetry or nonfictional work written in riksmål, or to the foremost translation to riksmål of fiction or nonfiction. Since 1991 the prize has been 100,000 kroner (approximately 12,500 €)

Thorleif Dahl
Thorleif Dahl (1891- 1967) was a Norwegian advertising man, publisher, scholar and patron of the arts. He was educated as a classic historian at the University of Oslo. After his elder brother Georg Sverdrup Dahl died in 1922, he saw himself obliged to continue the advertising agency his brother had established, Sverdrup Dahl A / S.  His success in business enabled him to donate substantial sums in support of his strong interest in art, culture and enlightenment. In 1956, he created a foundation linked to the Norwegian Academy for Language and Literature. The Norwegian Academy Prize in memory of Thorleif Dahl was named in his honor.

Prize winners 
 1983 – Arnold Eidslott    
 1984 – Astrid Hjertenæs Andersen    
 1985 – Leif Østby    
 1986 – Torborg Nedreaas    
 1987 – Stein Mehren    
 1988 – Bergljot Hobæk Haff    
 1989 – Anne-Lisa Amadou    
 1990 – Jan Jakob Tønseth  
 1991 – Erik Bystad  
 1992 – Egil Kraggerud    
 1993 – Ingard Hauge  
 1994 – Erik Egeberg 
 1995 – Kjell Heggelund
 1996 – Peter R. Holm    
 1997 – Tove Lie    
 1998 – Hans Aaraas
 1999 – Tor Åge Bringsværd
 2000 – Georg Johannesen 
 2001 – Sven Kærup Bjørneboe
 2002 – Dag Østerberg 
 2003 – Arne Worren
 2004 – Kjell Askildsen
 2005 – Torgeir Schjerven 
 2006 – Sverre Dahl
 2007 – Marianne Gullestad
 2008 – Arild Stubhaug
 2009 – Ingvar Ambjørnsen
 2010 - Torstein Bugge Høverstad
 2011 - Beate Vibe

References

Norwegian Academy Prize in memory of Thorleif Dahl